Pierre Monsan (born June 25, 1948, in Prades, Pyrénées-Orientales, France) is a French biochemist and entrepreneur. He is currently Professor emeritus at the Institut national des sciences appliquées de Toulouse (INSA Toulouse, affiliated to the University of Toulouse) and the founding director of the pre-industrial demonstrator Toulouse White Biotechnology (TWB).

Monsan's scientific interests include biocatalysis, biochemical and enzyme engineering. Beyond his academic work, Monsan is co-inventor on numerous patents and co-founded several industrial biotechnology companies.

Education and career
Monsan was educated at INSA Toulouse and the University of Toulouse where he graduated with an engineer degree (Ingénieur diplômé) in Biological Chemistry in 1969. He was then awarded his Doctor-Engineer Degree in 1971 and his PhD degree in 1977 from INSA Toulouse for research on enzyme immobilization. He served as lecturer in the Department of Biochemical Engineering at INSA Toulouse from 1969 and was later promoted to Assistant Professor (1973) and then Professor (1981).

In 1984, Monsan took a leave from Academia and co-founded BioEurope, a startup company specialized in industrial biocatalysis. There he served as CSO from 1984 to 1989, CEO from 1989 to 1993 and CSO again from 1993 to 1999 after the acquisition of the company by the Solabia Group. In 1993, Monsan returned to INSA Toulouse to lead a research group focusing on the discovery, characterisation and molecular engineering of enzymes, including glucansucrases and lipases. He was also appointed Professor at Ecole des Mines-ParisTech in 1993. From 1999 to 2003 he served as head of Department of Biochemical Engineering at INSA Toulouse. In 2012, he founded the pre-industrial demonstrator “Toulouse White Biotechnology” (TWB) with a €20M grant within the framework of the Investing for the Future national program (also called the grand emprunt) and served as its founding director until 2019.

Monsan is presently Professor emeritus at INSA Toulouse and the CEO of Cell-Easy, a start-up specializing in the production of stem cells.

Scientific work
Research by Monsan and his collaborators has focused on biocatalysis, biochemical engineering and enzyme engineering, published in over 230 articles. His fundamental includes investigation of structure-activity relationships of enzymes, (particularly glycoside hydrolases and lipases), and enzyme discovery by functional metagenomics. His more applied research involves biocatalysis in non-conventional (anhydrous) media for the synthesis of chemicals (e.g., chiral resolution to obtain enantiopure compounds), protein engineering (e.g. modification of substrate specificity, enantioselectivity, or thermostability), methods for enzyme immobilization, and bioreactor design and development.

Technology transfer and entrepreneurship
Monsan has been heavily involved in technology transfer throughout his career and is co-inventor of over 60 patents. He has developed several industrial biocatalytic processes for the production of polysaccharides, oligosaccharides and amino acid derivatives. Companies he has co-founded include BioEurope (1984; biocatalytic synthesis of reagents for the food, pharma and nutrition industries; now owned by the Solabia group), Biotrade (1996; waste water treatment) and Genibio (1998, food additives). He is and has been member of the scientific advisory board of several companies, including Danisco Venture, PCAS,

or Deinove.

In 2012, Monsan founded the pre-industrial demonstrator Toulouse White Biotechnology (TWB), an original institute dedicated to technology transfer through a consortium of public and industrial partners. TWB promotes industrial biotechnology and biobased economy through collaborative public/private research and development projects (e.g., THANAPLAST project in partnership with Carbios) and the creation of startups such as EnobraQ (development of yeasts able to metabolize CO2) or Pili (production of bacterial ink).

Awards and memberships 

 Chaptal Award for Chemical Arts from the French Society for the Promotion of Industry (2000)
 Founding member of the French Academy of Technologies (since 2000)
 Elected senior member of the Institut Universitaire de France (IUF) in 2003 and re-elected in 2008
 Elected member of the Executive Board of the European Federation of Biotechnology (since 2009)
 Biocat Award for lifetime achievement from the University of Hamburg (2012)
 Knight in the French National Order of Merit (2013)
 Docteur Honoris Causa of the University of Liège, Belgium (2015)
 Founding Chairman of the French Federation of Biotechnology (since 2015)
 Foreign member of the College of Fellows of the American Institute for Medical and Biological Engineering (AIMBE) (since 2016)
 Corresponding Member of the French Academy of Agriculture (since 2016)
 Enzyme Engineering Award from Engineering Conferences International and Genencor (2017)
 Knight in the French Legion of Honour (2017)

References

External links 

Website of Toulouse White Biotechnology
TBI - Toulouse Biotechnology Institute
From metabolic engineering to synthetic biology and industrial biotechnology, Pierre Monsan, 25 March 2015, Collège de France (in French)
 Interview of Pierre Monsan at the BIOKET Global Conference on Bioeconomy Key Enabling Technologies 6-8 March 2018, Strasbourg, France

1948 births
Living people
Biotechnologists
Chevaliers of the Légion d'honneur
French biochemists
20th-century French chemists
Knights of the Ordre national du Mérite
Scientists from Toulouse
University of Toulouse alumni
Academic staff of Mines Paris - PSL